Rudolf Tönnies was an Austro-Hungarian and Yugoslav architect and politician (councillor of the Drava Banovina), son of the famous Swedish industrialist Gustav Tönnies.
Together with the Czech Josip Pospišil and the Austrian Ernst Lichtblau, who had all studied at the Art Academy in Vienna with Karl von Hasenauer and Otto Wagner, Tönnies is considered one of the proponents of the "Bosnian style" as a step towards architectural modernism in Bosnia and Herzegovina, as opposed to Moorish Revival style

Biography 
Rudolf Tönnies studied construction and civil engineering and worked for the Croatian government in Zagreb, then as lead architect for the Government of Bosnia and Herzegovina in Sarajevo, where he left among the most notable residential and mixed buildings in Vienna Secession style in town. In 1918 he returned to Ljubljana, obtained a trade concession (building master) and joined his brothers. In Ljubljana he built around 1923 the Credit Bank (today the seat of the National Bank) and at the same time the Ljubljana yard (headquarters of Railway Transport Company).

In 1898 he married Paula Faller (Ivanec, Varaždin, 22 August 1864); they had a daughter, Frigga Tönnies.

Tönnies also contributed to the Bosnian style in architecture, which can be compared with Scandinavian National Romanticism.  The Bosnian Style was championed by a younger generation of architects, like Czech architect Josip Pospišil, Slovene architect Rudolf Tönnies, and Austrian architect Ernst Lichtblau, who all studied at the Art Academy in Vienna with Karl von Hasenauer and Otto Wagner. The style was, however, named by Sarajevo's senior architect, Josip Vancaš, for whom many of these younger architects worked.

Works 
 Palace of the Orthodox Metropolitan, Štrosmajerova 1 Sarajevo (1899)
 Villa Rädisch, Petrakijina 13 Sarajevo, 1906. This Vienna secession villa boasts a dense flower carpet.
 House of Milan Jojkić, Muvekita 8 Sarajevo, 1906. The partitioning of this façade is similar to that of the house that Tönnies designed for Mehmed-beg Fadilpašić some years later.
 Residential and commercial building on Zelenih beretki, Sarajevo 1907
 House of Mehmed-beg Fadilpašić, Franjevačka 2 Sarajevo, 1910. The undulating façade, the floral and geometric elements and the protruding roof show the influences of both Bosnian vernacular and Vienna Secession architecture.
 Building of Altarac Meyer, Ferhadija 22 Sarajevo, 1911. This building, an example of the geometric Art Nouveau, typical of the late period, also shows some influence of Neoclassicism.
 House of Atijas Mordohaj Rahae, Valtera Perića 4 Sarajevo 1911. This building has a notable corner solution with a dome.
 Bank on obala Kulina bana, Sarajevo 1913

See also

 František Blažek
 Karel Pařík
 Josip Vancaš

References

Bibliography 
 Slovenski biografski leksikon 1925-1991.(2009). Elektronska izdaja. Ljubljana: SAZU
 Enciklopedija Slovenije; knjiga 13, Mladinska knjiga, Ljubljana, 1999

External links 
 Primorski Dnevnik
 Slovenski biografski leksikon

Art Nouveau architects
Vienna Secession architects
19th-century Slovenian architects
20th-century Slovenian architects
Bosnia and Herzegovina architects
1869 births
1929 deaths
Architects from Ljubljana